Robert FitzRalph (sometimes known as Robert son of William FitzRalph) was a medieval Bishop of Worcester.

Life

FitzRalph was the son of William FitzRalph, who was a landowner in Derbyshire and was High Sheriff of Nottinghamshire, Derbyshire and the Royal Forests 1170–1180 and was seneschal of Normandy 1178–1200. Robert held a prebend in the diocese of York before he was Archdeacon of Nottingham in 1185. He also held a prebend in the diocese of Lincoln.

FitzRalph was elected to the see of Worcester on 1 July 1190 and consecrated on 5 May 1191. He died in 1193, probably on 27 June but possibly on 14 July.

Citations

References
 British History Online Archdeacons of Nottingham accessed on 3 November 2007
 British History Online Bishops of Worcester accessed on 3 November 2007
 

Archdeacons of Nottingham
Bishops of Worcester
12th-century English Roman Catholic bishops
1193 deaths
Year of birth unknown